Hamza Riazuddin (born 19 December 1989) is a former English cricketer. He is a right-handed lower-order batsman and a right-arm medium-fast bowler who last played for Hampshire. He is a British Pakistani. He was born in Hendon and lived in Woodley, Berkshire for most of his childhood but now lives in Southampton, Hampshire, near to the club's training ground.

Throughout his childhood, he played for Hurst Cricket Club and he also captained several age-group Berkshire County Cricket Club cricket teams.

Riazuddin is a product of the Hampshire cricket academy. Having played his first game for the Hampshire Second XI against a Victoria team at the age of 15, he played semi-regularly in the 2006 and 2007 Second XI Championship, and in the ECB Under-17 Regional Festival.

Having made a single Second XI appearance in 2008, Riazuddin's first-class debut came in May, in a match against Somerset. He took one wicket, that of Ian Blackwell in the first innings, and was the most economical bowler in a second innings in which Somerset amassed a large score. His only contribution with the bat was four runs in the first innings.

His one-day debut came in the Friends Provident Trophy in a victory against Glamorgan about two weeks later.

He was selected for the England Under-19 squad to tour South Africa in January 2009.

He was a member of Hampshires 2009 Friends Provident Trophy winning squad. This came just a few weeks after being named Captain of the England Under-19 squad.

External links
Hamza Riazuddin at CricketArchive
Hamza Riazuddin at Cricinfo

1989 births
English cricketers
Hampshire cricketers
Living people
People educated at Bradfield College
People from Hendon
Sportspeople from Reading, Berkshire
English people of Pakistani descent
British sportspeople of Pakistani descent